Okayama 4th district is a single-member electoral district for the House of Representatives, the lower house of the national Diet of Japan. It is located in central coastal Okayama and covers the majority of the city of Kurashiki and the (as administrative unit: former) county of Tsukubo that has only one remaining municipality: Hayashima town. As of September 2012, 367,702 eligible voters were registered in the district, giving it slightly below average vote weight.

The first representative for Okayama 4th district was Liberal Democrat Ryūtarō Hashimoto who had represented the five-member 2nd district before the electoral reform, as had his father Ryōgo before him. Hashimoto, hit by a scandal over political donations from the Japanese Dentists' Federation in 2004, retired from politics in the 2005 general election. His son Gaku tried to "inherit" the seat, but lost to Democrat Michiyoshi Yunoki by a margin of about 6,000 votes. Hashimoto won a seat in the Chūgoku proportional representation block. In his second attempt in the 2009 general election, he lost to Yunoki by an even wider margin (sekihairitsu 72.4) and also failed to win a proportional seat. In his third attempt in the landslide election of 2012, Hashimoto won the district.

List of representatives

Recent election results

References 

Politics of Okayama Prefecture
Districts of the House of Representatives (Japan)